William Taylor (1886 – 7 May 1966) was an English footballer who played as a half-back for Southwell, Mansfield Mechanics, Notts County, Shirebrook, Burnley, Oldham Athletic, and Newark Town.

Career
Taylor played for Southwell, Mansfield Mechanics, Notts County, Shirebrook, and Burnley. He played one game as a guest for Port Vale during World War II, in a 2–0 defeat to Manchester United in a Lancashire regional Section, Subsidiary Tournament match at the Old Recreation Ground on 13 April 1918. He later played for Oldham Athletic, and Newark Town.

Career statistics
Source:

References

1886 births
1966 deaths
People from Southwell, Nottinghamshire
Footballers from Nottinghamshire
English footballers
Association football midfielders
Mansfield Mechanics F.C. players
Notts County F.C. players
Shirebrook Miners Welfare F.C. players
Burnley F.C. players
Port Vale F.C. wartime guest players
Oldham Athletic A.F.C. players
Newark Town F.C. players
English Football League players